Elachista vanderwolfi is a moth of the family Elachistidae that is found in Spain, France and Austria.

References 

vanderwolfi
Moths described in 1992
Moths of Europe